Burra-Moko Head Sandstone is a type of sedimentary rock occurring in the Sydney Basin in eastern Australia. This stratum is up to 112 metres thick. The rock is composed of quartzose to quartz lithic sandstone. It is situated below the Mount York Claystone in the Blue Mountains. Formed in the early Triassic, it is part of the Narrabeen Group of sedimentary rocks.

See also
 Sydney Basin
 Banks Wall Sandstone
 Blue Mountains Basalts
 Mount York Claystone
 Narrabeen group

References

Geologic formations of Australia
Triassic Australia
Sandstone formations
Geology of New South Wales